Durham County Council elections are held every four years. Durham County Council is the local authority for the unitary authority of County Durham. The county council was first created in 1889 as an upper-tier authority, had its powers and territory reformed in 1974 under the Local Government Act 1972, and became a unitary authority in 2009, when the lower-tier district councils in the area were abolished. Since becoming a unitary authority, 126 councillors have been elected from 63 wards.

Political control
Durham was the first county council to be controlled by Labour, who took power in 1919. Prior to 1974 political control was held by the following parties:

Administrative county

Non-metropolitan county

The first election to the reformed county council was held in 1973, initially operating as a shadow authority before coming into its revised powers on 1 April 1974. Political control of the council since 1973 has been held by the following parties:

Unitary authority

Leadership
The leaders of the council since 2001 have been:

County council elections

County result maps

District council elections
Prior to the formation of the unitary authority in 2009, the county was divided into a number of second tier districts. The following articles detail the local elections to those district councils. The Borough of Darlington has formed a unitary authority outside the area covered by the County Council since 1997.
Chester-le-Street District Council elections, 1973 – 2009 (council abolished)
Durham City Council elections, 1973 – 2009 (council abolished)
Darlington Borough Council elections, 1973 – 1997 (unitary authority 1997 – present)
Derwentside District Council elections, 1973 – 2009 (council abolished)
Easington District Council elections, 1973 – 2009 (council abolished)
Sedgefield Borough Council elections, 1973 – 2009 (council abolished)
Teesdale District Council elections, 1973 – 2009 (council abolished)
Wear Valley District Council elections, 1973 – 2009 (council abolished)

By-election results
The following is an incomplete list of by-elections to Durham County Council.

1997-2008

2008-2013

2013-2017

2017-2021

2021-present

Notes

References

By-election results

External links
Durham County Council

 
Council elections in County Durham
Unitary authority elections in England